Valeria Rapatamor “Valerie” Pedro (16 November 1976 – 25 March 2007) was a weightlifter who competed internationally for Palau. She was the first woman to represent Palau at the Olympics.

Pedro was part of the first team from Palau to compete at the Olympics when she was picked for the 2000 Summer Olympics in Sydney. She was her country's first ever flag bearer and first ever competitor when she competed in the light-heavyweight class; out of the 15 entries Pedro finished 14th after one lifter failed pulled out.

Death
In March 2007, it was reported that Valerie Pedro had died due to dehydration.

References

External links
 

1976 births
2007 deaths
Palauan female weightlifters
Olympic weightlifters of Palau
Weightlifters at the 2000 Summer Olympics
Deaths by dehydration